
Gmina Śmigiel is an urban-rural gmina (administrative district) in Kościan County, Greater Poland Voivodeship, in west-central Poland.

Villages
Apart from the town of Śmigiel, Gmina Śmigiel contains the villages and settlements of Bielawy, Bronikowo, Brońsko, Bruszczewo, Brzeziny, Chełkowo, Czacz, Czaczyk, Glińsko, Gniewowo, Jeligowo, Jezierzyce, Karmin, Karpisz, Karśnice, Koszanowo, Księginki, Machcin, Morownica, Nadolnik, Nietążkowo, Nowa Wieś, Nowe Szczepankowo, Nowy Białcz, Nowy Świat, Olszewo, Parsko, Podśmigiel, Poladowo, Prętkowice, Przysieka Polska, Robaczyn, Sierpowo, Sikorzyn, Skoraczewo, Smolno, Spławie, Stara Przysieka Druga, Stara Przysieka Pierwsza, Stare Bojanowo, Stare Szczepankowo, Stary Białcz, Wonieść, Wydorowo, Żegrówko, Żegrowo, Żydowo and Zygmuntowo.

Neighbouring gminas
Gmina Śmigiel is bordered by the gminas of Kamieniec, Kościan, Krzywiń, Lipno, Osieczna, Przemęt, Wielichowo and Włoszakowice.

References

Polish official population figures 2006

Smigiel
Kościan County